This is a list of Canada's Accredited Zoos and Aquariums member zoos and aquariums.

Members

Former members
 Bowmanville Zoo – Bowmanville, Ontario – closed on 10 October 2016
 Crystal Gardens Conservation Centre – Victoria, British Columbia – closed on 2 September 2004
 Jardin Zoologique du Quebec – Quebec City, Quebec – closed on 31 March 2006
 Cherry Brook Zoo – Saint John, New Brunswick – closed in 2020
 Marineland of Canada – Niagara Falls, Ontario – withdrew from membership in May 2017
 Mountain View Conservation & Breeding Society – Langley, British Columbia – had its membership revoked by CAZA due to claims of animal abuse

Affiliated
 Hagen Avicultural Research Institute – Rigaud, Quebec

Commercial members
 Cinemuse Network – Gatineau, Quebec
 International Seafood and Bait Ltd. – Shippagan, New Brunswick
 Interzoo – Laval, Quebec
 Kingfisher Conservation Biology Laboratory – Whitchurch-Stouffville, Ontario
 Rare Import/Export Incorporated – Saint-Roch-de-l'Achigan, Quebec, Quebec
 Sunshine Polishing International – Saint-Hubert, Quebec

References

 
 
CAZA

CAZA